Faleāsao County is a county in the Manu'a District in American Samoa. The county is contiguous with its only village, also named Faleasao.

Demographics

Faleasao County was first recorded beginning with the 1912 special census. Regular decennial censuses were taken beginning in 1920.

Villages
Faleasao

References 

 

Populated places in American Samoa